The men's 500 metres speed skating competition for the 2006 Winter Olympics was held in Turin, Italy. The competition consisted of two separate 500 metre races, with the competitors ranked by their cumulative time from the two races.

Records
Prior to this competition, the existing world and Olympic records were as follows.

500 meters (1 race)

500 meters x 2 (2 races)

No new world or Olympic records were set during this competition.

Results

Race 1

Pair order

Skater with first inner lane listed first

 Brock Miron, CAN (alone, first inner)
 Dmitry Lobkov, RUS – Sergey Kornilov, RUS
 Maciej Ustynowicz, POL – Vincent Labrie, CAN
 Choi Jae-bong, KOR – Aleksandr Zhigin, KAZ
 Janne Hänninen, FIN – Aleksey Proshin, RUS
 Artur Waś, POL – Erik Zachrisson, SWE
 Mika Poutala, FIN – Maurizio Carnino, ITA
 Zhuo Lu, CHN – Jan Bos, NED
 Dmitry Dorofeyev, RUS – Erben Wennemars, NED
 Li Yu, CHN – Pekka Koskela, FIN
 Ermanno Ioriatti, ITA – An Weijiang, CHN
 Yūya Oikawa, JPN – Simon Kuipers, NED
 Hiroyasu Shimizu, JPN – Lee Kyou-hyuk, KOR
 Tucker Fredricks, USA – Keiichiro Nagashima, JPN
 Beorn Nijenhuis, NED – Kwon Sun Chun, KOR
 Joji Kato, JPN – Michael Ireland, CAN
 Joey Cheek, USA – Jeremy Wotherspoon, CAN
 Casey FitzRandolph, USA – Yu Fengtong, CHN
 Kip Carpenter, USA – Lee Kang-seok, KOR

Fastest 100 m

The ten fastest times are listed

Race 2

Pair order

Skater with first inner lane listed first

 Beorn Nijenhuis, NED (alone, last outer)
 Kwon Sun Chun, KOR – Li Yu, CHN
 Aleksandr Zhigin, KAZ – Artur Waś, POL
 Brock Miron, CAN – Vincent Labrie, CAN
 Maurizio Carnino, ITA – Kip Carpenter, USA
 Simon Kuipers, NED – Zhuo Lu, CHN
 Sergey Kornilov, RUS – Maciej Ustynowicz, POL
 Aleksey Proshin, RUS – Tucker Fredricks, USA
 An Weijiang, CHN – Mika Poutala, FIN
 Erik Zachrisson, SWE – Ermanno Ioriatti, ITA
 Lee Kyou-hyuk, KOR – Casey FitzRandolph, USA
 Jan Bos, NED – Hiroyasu Shimizu, JPN
 Choi Jae-bong, KOR – Keiichiro Nagashima, JPN
 Michael Ireland, CAN – Joji Kato, JPN
 Pekka Koskela, FIN – Janne Hänninen, FIN
 Erben Wennemars, NED – Dmitry Lobkov, RUS
 Yūya Oikawa, JPN – Yu Fengtong, CHN
 Jeremy Wotherspoon, CAN – Dmitry Dorofeyev, RUS
 Lee Kang-seok, KOR – Joey Cheek, USA

Fastest 100 m

References

External links
 

Men's speed skating at the 2006 Winter Olympics